Alonso Mayo (born December 30, 1978) is a Peruvian film director and screenwriter best known for his independent film The Story of Luke (2012). He has won a Student Academy Award (for Wednesday Afternoon).

Early life
Mayo was born in Lima, Peru, and grew up traveling back and forth between Peru and Lawrence, Kansas, while his mother, special education teacher Liliana Mayo, did her post-graduate studies at the University of Kansas. Mayo graduated from Lawrence High School.

Mayo received a B.A. from University of Lima, where he majored in film and journalism. He received a M.F.A. in film directing from the American Film Institute Conservatory. His thesis film Wednesday Afternoon, starring Jose Yenque and Jeffrey Licon, was official selection of the Deauville American Film Festival, Camerimage Film Festival and won a Directors Guild of America Student Award  as well as the Gold Medal in the Narrative category of the 2005 Student Academy Awards.

Career
Mayo co-directed the Southern Poverty Law Center's Teaching Tolerance documentary Viva La Causa, about the life of Cesar Chavez, which was shortlisted for the 2008 Academy Awards. In 2010, Mayo directed the dramatic web series Untitled Fiction Project about the aftermath of an affair. The 13 episode series was shot using structured improvisation. The storyline was later continued in 2013's Untitled Murder Project 2.0, a 36 episode experiment in nonlinear storytelling.

Mayo directed his first feature film in 2011, the comedy-drama The Story of Luke about a young man with autism on a quest for a job and a girlfriend, starring Lou Taylor Pucci, Seth Green, Cary Elwes and Kristin Bauer. The film was inspired by Mayo's experiences with young men and women on the autism spectrum at Centro Ann Sullivan del Perú as seen in his research documentary Just Like Anyone. The Story of Luke premiered at the 2012 San Diego Film Festival, where it won Best Film. It went on to win over 20 film festival awards and was released theatrically and on demand in 2013 by Gravitas Ventures.

Mayo teaches film directing and screenwriting at New York Film Academy's Los Angeles campus.

Filmography

References

External links
 

Peruvian film directors
AFI Conservatory alumni
Peruvian screenwriters
Male screenwriters
People from Lawrence, Kansas
Living people
1978 births